This is a list of notable women botanical illustrators and artists.

A
 Elfriede Abbe (1919–2012) - American sculptor, engraver, illustrator
 Harriet Isabel Adams (fl. 1906–1910)
 Nancy Adams (1926–2007), New Zealand botanical artist, botanist, and museum curator 
 Beverly Allen (born 1945), Australian artist
 Mary Morton Allport (1806–1895), English Australian artist, lithographer, etcher, and engraver
 Blanche Ames Ames (1878–1969), American artist, activist, suffragist, and inventor
 Lady Mabel Annesley (1881–1959), wood-engraver and watercolour painter
 Margaret Neilson Armstrong (1867–1944), American designer and illustrator
 Mary Ann Armstrong (1838–1910), British botanical fern artist
 Mary Daisy Arnold (–1955), botanical artist
 Alison Marjorie Ashby (1901–1987), Australian botanical artist and plant collector
 Louisa Atkinson (1834–1872), Australian botanical artist, illustrator, naturalist and writer

B
 Clarissa Munger Badger (1806–1889), American botanical illustrator and poet
 Anne Elizabeth Ball (1808–1872), Irish botanist and algologist
 Mary Elizabeth Banning (1822–1903), American mycologist and botanical illustrator
 Mary Elizabeth Barber (1818–1899), British-born botanist and painter active in South Africa
 Dorothy Barclay (1892–1940), South African botanical painter
 Anne Maria Barkly (c. 1838–1932), British botanist 
 Anne Henslow Barnard (died 1899), botanical illustrator
 Eileen Barnes (1876–1956), Irish botanical artist
 Gertrud Bartusch, German botanical illustrator
 Moyra Barry (1886–1960), Irish artist
 Rose Barton 
 Gertrud Bartusch
 Françoise Basseporte
 Françoise Basseporte
 Auriol Batten
 Mary Battersby
 Ruth Ellen Berkeley
 Elizabeth Blackwell
 Edith Blake
 Susannah Blaxill
 Agnes Block
 Fanny Blood
 Hertha Bokelmann
 Winifred Boys-Smith
 Olivia Marie Braida-Chiusano
 Winifred M. A. Brooke
 Rhona Brown
 Margaret Warriner Buck
 Priscilla Susan Bury
 Mildred Anne Butler
 Emilie von Büttner

C
 Beatrice Orchard Carter
 Elisa-Honorine Champin
 Mary Agnes Chase
 Maureen Elizabeth Church
 Edith Clements
 Lise Cloquet (1788–1860) - French botanical painter
 Elizabeth Conabere
 Gillian Condy
 Mary Elizabeth Connell
 Catherine Teresa Cookson
 Frances Crawshaw
 Shirley Gale Cross
 Clare Cryan
 Lady Charlotte Wheeler Cuffe
 Fanny Currey

D
 Mary Delany
 Louise-Cécile Descamps-Sabouret (b. 3 October 1855) - French painter and botanical artist
 Barbara Regina Dietzsch
 Ethel May Dixie
 Catharina Helena Dörrien
 Bessie Downes
 Doris Downes
 Sarah Drake
 Hélène Durand

E
 Audrey Eagle
 Mary Emily Eaton
 Frances Anne Edgeworth 
 Thérèse Ekblom
 Diana Conyngham Ellis
 Ella Howard Estill
 Nathalie Elma d'Esménard
 Barbara Everard

F
 Marianne Fannin
 Madeleine Charlotte Fawkes
 Susan Fereday
 Minna Fernald
 Mary Fielding
 Louisa Finch, Countess of Aylesford
 Ellen Thayer Fisher
 Agnes Dunbar Moodie Fitzgibbon
 Rosa Fiveash
 Margaret Flockton
 Margaret Forrest
 Cherryl Fountain
 Kathleen Fox
 Millicent Franks (1886–1961), South African botanical illustrator
 Ingeborg Frederiksen (1886–1976), Danish painter and illustrator
 Magdalena Fürstin
 Faith Fyles

G
 Catherine Gage 
 Giovanna Garzoni
 Adelia Sarah Gates
 Marguerite Primrose Gerrard
 Elizabeth Gray
 Mary Grierson
 Maria Gugelberg von Moos

H
 Lucretia Breazeale Hamilton
 Charlotte Hardcastle
 Florence May Harding
 Emily Harris
 Gertrude Hartland
 Sarah Elizabeth Hay-Williams
 Esmé Frances Hennessy
 Johanna Helena Herolt
 Georgina Hetley
 Orra White Hitchcock
 Sarah Hoare
 Rosemary Charlotte Holcroft
 Maria Elizabeth Holland
 Berthe Hoola van Nooten
 Annie E. Hoyle
 Regina Olson Hughes
 Ellen Hutchins
 Alice Clary Earle Hyde

I
 Hannah Cassels im Thurn

J
 Alice Jacob
 Eveline Annie Jenkins
 Barbara Jeppe
 Nina Jones

K
 Mary Maytham Kidd
 Pauline Kies
 Martha King
 Elizabeth and Mary Kirby
 Henriëtte Geertruida Knip

L
 Deborah Lambkin
 Grania Langrishe (born 1934), Irish botanical artist
 Kathleen Annie Lansdell
 Frieda Lauth
 Mary Lawrance
 Ann Lee
 Sara Plummer Lemmon
 Cythna Letty
 Blythe Loutit
 Lena Lowis

M
 Kathleen Marescaux
 Bessie Niemeyer Marshall
 Kathleen McArthur
 Mary McMurtrie
 Margaret Mee
 Mary Mendum
 Louisa Anne Meredith
 Maria Sibylla Merian
 Maria Morris Miller
 Maria Moninckx
 Harriet Morgan
 Henrietta Maria Moriarty

N
 Amanda Newton
 Philippa Nikulinsky
 Marianne North
 Carol Nourse

O
 Helen Sophia O'Hara

P
 Mary Maud Page
 Olive Coates Palgrave
 Marietta Pallis
 Ernestine Panckoucke
 Louise von Panhuys
 Deborah Griscom Passmore
 Helena Christina van de Pavord Smits
 Olivia Peguero
 Emily Pelloe
 Margaret Pieroni
 Barbara Pike
 Olive Pink
 Frederica Plunket
 Katherine Plunket
 Pierre Antoine Poiteau
 Elsa Pooley
 Clara Pope
 Caroline Pounds
 Anne Pratt

R
 Christie Repasy
 Sarah Rhodes
 Elsie Garrett Rice
 Ellen Robbins
 Emma Roberts
 Nellie Roberts
 Margaret Roscoe
 Stella Ross-Craig
 Celia Rosser
 Arabella Elizabeth Roupell
 Ellis Rowan
 Anne Rudge

S
 Cora Helena Sarle
 Marion Satterlee
 Elisabeth Hallowell Saunders
 Katharine Saunders
 Vera Scarth-Johnson
 Ellen Isham Schutt
 Helena Scott
 Susan Sex
 Lydia Shackleton
 Elsie Louise Shaw
 Jessica Rosemary Shepherd
 Isabella McHutcheson Sinclair
 Susie Barstow Skelding
 Dorothea Eliza Smith
 Ethelynde Smith
 Matilda Smith
 Lilian Snelling
 Holly Somerville
 Charlotte Caroline Sowerby
 Frances Stackhouse Acton
 Emily Stackhouse
 Mary Anne Stebbing
 Margaret Stoddart
 Margaret Stones
 Edith Frances Mary Struben
 Carrie Sweetser

T
 Cynthia Tait
 Alice Tangerini
 Anna Heyward Taylor
 Elizabeth Taylor
 Emma Homan Thayer
 Harriet Anne Thiselton-Dyer
 Estelle Thomson
 Elisa Marie Thornam
 Emily Jane Thwaits
 Anne Marie Trechslin
 Charlotte Georgina Trower
 Anna Maria Truter
 Elizabeth Twining

V
 Anna Maria Vaiani
 Elinor Frances Vallentin
 Vesque Sisters
 Henriette Vincent

W
 Mary Vaux Walcott
 Ada Hill Walker
 Anna Frances Walker
 Anna Maria Walker
 Wendy F. Walsh
 Jan Wandelaar
 Ellaphie Ward-Hilhorst
 Charlotte, Lady Wheeler-Cuffe
 Emily Whymper
 Caroline Catharine Wilkinson
 Augusta Innes Withers
 Alida Withoos
 Anne Kingsbury Wollstonecraft
 Helen Adelaide Wood

References

Lists of women artists
Women botanical
Lists of botanists